This is a list of Olympic medalists in sailing.

Current classes 
List of Olympic medalists in sailing by class

Open 470

Men's 470

Women's 470

49er

49er FX

Men’s Kite
Coming soon

Women’s Kite
Coming soon

Laser

Laser Radial

Nacra 17

Discontinued classes

International Metre Rule

5.5 Metre

6 Metre

7 Metre

8 Metre

10 Metre

12 Metre

6.5 Metre

12' Dinghy

12 Square meter Sharpie

18' Dinghy

Finn

Skerry cruiser

30m2 Skerry cruiser

40m2 Skerry cruiser

Division II

Dragon

Elliott 6m

Europe

Firefly

Flying Dutchman

Monotype

Lechner A-390

Mistral One Design

O-Jolle

Men's RS:X

Women's RS:X

Snowbird

Soling

Star

Swallow

Tempest

Ton Classes

0 to .5 ton

.5 to 1 ton

1 to 2 ton

2 to 3 ton

3 to 10 ton

10 to 20 ton

20+ ton

Open class

Tornado

Windglider

Yngling

References 
 

Sailing
medalists by class